PTW may refer to:

Paper Thin Walls, an American band
PTW Architects, best known for designing the Beijing National Aquatics Center
Heritage Field Airport
Poison the Well, a musical group from Florida
The Pychkine-Tews-Weinmann attack used to defeat Wired Equivalent Privacy encryption.
Permit to Work